Rajeshbhai Naranbhai Chudasama (born 10 April 1982) is Member of Parliament from Junagadh-Gir Somnath, Gujarat (Lok Sabha). He was previously a Member of the Gujarat Legislative Assembly (MLA). He was elected from Mangrol in Junagadh district as a candidate of the Bharatiya Janata Party (BJP) in 2012. He has won the 2014 Lok Sabha election from Junagadh Lok Sabha constituency. Mr. Chudasama belong to the Koli caste of Gujarat.

Positions Held 
 2012 - May 2014,	Member of Gujarat Legislative Assembly
 May 2014,	Elected to 16th Lok Sabha
 1 Sep. 2014 - 25 May 2019,	Member of Standing Committee on Transport, Tourism and Culture
 Member of Consultative Committee, Ministry of Agriculture
 May 2019, Re-elected to 17th Lok Sabha (2nd term)
 13 Sept. 2019 onwards, Member of Standing Committee on Chemicals & Fertilisers
 Member of Consultative Committee, Ministry of Chemicals and Fertilisers

References

External links
Official website

Living people
Members of the Gujarat Legislative Assembly
People from Junagadh district
India MPs 2014–2019
Lok Sabha members from Gujarat
Gujarati people
Bharatiya Janata Party politicians from Gujarat
1982 births
India MPs 2019–present